Leroy Township is a civil township of Calhoun County in the U.S. state of Michigan. It is part of the Battle Creek, Michigan Metropolitan Statistical Area. The population was 3,712 at the 2010 census.

History
Leroy Township was established in 1837.

Geography
Leroy Township is located in western Calhoun County, bordered by the city of Battle Creek to the north. Kalamazoo County is to the west. Unincorporated communities within the township include Pine Creek, East Leroy, Joppa, West Leroy, Morgan Corners, and Sonoma.

Demographics

As of the census of 2000, there were 3,240 people, 1,190 households, and 937 families residing in the township. The racial makeup of the township was 96.70% White, 0.68% African American, 0.43% Native American, 0.15% Asian, 0.65% from other races, and 1.39% from two or more races. Hispanic or Latino of any race were 1.67% of the population.

There were 1,190 households, out of which 34.5% had children under the age of 18 living with them, 68.2% were married couples living together, 7.4% had a female householder with no husband present, and 21.2% were non-families. 17.3% of all households were made up of individuals, and 6.6% had someone living alone who was 65 years of age or older.  The average household size was 2.70 and the average family size was 3.04.

In the township the population was spread out, with 25.9% under the age of 18, 6.5% from 18 to 24, 27.0% from 25 to 44, 28.2% from 45 to 64, and 12.3% who were 65 years of age or older.  The median age was 40 years. For every 100 females, there were 96.2 males.  For every 100 females age 18 and over, there were 96.4 males.

The median income for a household in the township was $52,361, and the median income for a family was $54,754. Males had a median income of $40,938 versus $29,517 for females. The per capita income for the township was $22,799.  About 6.1% of families and 8.6% of the population were below the poverty line, including 9.9% of those under age 18 and 10.8% of those age 65 or over.

References

Notes

Sources

External links
Leroy Township official website

Townships in Calhoun County, Michigan
1837 establishments in Michigan
Townships in Michigan